Efraín Alberto Ruales Ríos (Guayaquil, Ecuador, August 31, 1984January 27, 2021) was an Ecuadorian actor, model, musician and television presenter, known for his appearances in Solteros Sin Compromiso, La panadería, and ¡Así Pasa!, and for his characters Lorenzo, Professor Cachimundo, El Taita and Viperino in the variety program En contacto de Ecuavisa. Ruales was also the bassist for Equilivre and Rokket.

Biography 
Efraín Alberto Ruales Ríos was born on August 31, 1984 in Guayaquil, Ecuador. At the Cristóbal Colón Salesian College, he was a part of the U12 soccer team with Christian Noboa, and he studied Bachelors of Science in Business Administration at the Universidad Del Pacífico.

He formed the musical quartet Equilivre, in which he played bass, alongside Erick Mujica (guitar), Fernando Escobar (vocals and second guitar), and Daniel Ballesteros (drums). Ruales, together with Diego Spotorno, created and co-owned Raymi Enterprises, an independent production company that managed their artistic presentations. Under the company, they launched their theatrical show 2 Solteros en Gira, which included a comedy routine. Raymi Enterprises was also in charge of managing Rokket, a band which debuted at the end of the program Ecuador Tiene Talento (Ecuador's Got Talent) on Ecuavisa, with the song Píldora.

Television 
In 2005, Ruales was part of the Ecuavisa series, Pura Boca, and the telenovela Amores que matan. In 2007, he played Benjamin in Solteros sin commitment. In 2008, Ruales and his band Equilivre released the video clip "Cuéntame", with the album Together with you. This album consisted of ten songs played on the telenovela El Secreto de Toño Palomino, in which Ruales was cast as the baker Juan. He also played Wacho in the telenovela The successful Lcdo. Cardoso. In 2009, Ruales was part of the cast on the comic program La Panadería, and in 2011 with La Panadería 2, where he played characters like Dr. Malbaso, El Mijín, Prof. Cachimundo, Sondepueta, El Taita and Lorenzo.

In 2010, he played detective César Muñoz in the TC Televisión soap opera Fanatikda. In 2011, he played Santiago in the comedy series Condominio. Later, he replaced Richard Baker as a presenter on the program De casa en casa. Subsequently, in April 2012, he joined En Contacto with a segment of comedic skits, interpreting his characters from La Panadería, and in May served as presenter after Roberto Angelelli's departure. In 2012, he played Lorenzo. On 20 May 2013, he joined the comic series ¡Así Pasa! as Eduardo Bayas, head of a funeral home. He also played the characters of El Taita, El Poeta and Lorenzo, whom he previously played in La panadería 2 and En Contacto. In that same year he played the role of Alberto "Beto" in the series Veto al feo, a production based on the Colombian telenovela Yo soy Betty, la fea (English: Ugly Betty).

Murder 
Ruales was murdered on January 27, 2021, at the age of 36, after being shot in his car while leaving a gym in Guayaquil. A few hours after the event, messages from fans and followers appeared on social networks speculating that he should be called to testify before the Prosecutor's Office on the day of his murder for alleged involvement in the case of Daniel Salcedo and the family of former president Abdalá Bucaram Ortiz, accused due to mismanagement of the health crisis and other crimes, however the Prosecutor's Office flatly denied said speculations, stating that Ruales was never linked to this case, much less should he be summoned to provide any statement.

References

External links
 

1984 births
2021 deaths
People from Guayaquil
Ecuadorian male telenovela actors
Ecuadorian male television actors
Ecuadorian television presenters
Ecuadorian musicians
People murdered in Ecuador
Deaths by firearm in Ecuador